Boneset may refer to:

Plants
Various species of Ageratina
Various species of Eupatorium
Particularly Eupatorium perfoliatum
Symphytum officinale, a garden herb also called comfrey

Album
Boneset, an album by Diane Cluck